This article describes the history of New Zealand cricket from the 2000–01 season.

Leading players during this period include Stephen Fleming, Shane Bond, Daniel Vettori and Scott Styris.

Domestic cricket
The Shell Trophy was replaced as the first-class domestic championship in 2001 by the State Championship, sponsored by the State Insurance Company.

From 2010 after State sponsorship ceased the competition was renamed as the Plunket Shield.

Shell Trophy winners
 2000–01 – Wellington Firebirds

State Championship winners
 2001–02 – Auckland Aces
 2002–03 – Auckland Aces
 2003–04 – Wellington Firebirds
 2004–05 – Auckland Aces
 2005–06 – Central Districts Stags
 2006–07 – Northern Districts Knights
 2007–08 – Canterbury Wizards
 2008–09 – Auckland Aces

Plunket Shield winners
 2009–10 – Northern Districts Knights
 2010–11 – Canterbury Wizards
 2011–12 – Northern Districts Knights
 2012–13 – Central Districts Stags
 2013–14 – Canterbury Wizards
 2014–15 – Canterbury Kings
 2015–16 – Auckland Aces
 2016–17 – Canterbury Kings
 2017–18 – Central Districts Stags
 2018–19 – Central Districts Stags
 2019–20 – Wellington Firebirds

International tours of New Zealand

Zimbabwe 2000–01
 [ 1st Test] at Basin Reserve, Wellington – match drawn

Sri Lanka 2000–01
This was a limited overs tour only.  For details, see: Sri Lankan cricket team in New Zealand in 2000–01.

Bangladesh 2001–02
 1st Test (Westpac Park) – New Zealand won by an innings and 52 runs
 2nd Test (Basin Reserve) – New Zealand won by an innings and 74 runs

England 2001–02
 1st Test (Jade Stadium, Christchurch) – England won by 98 runs
 2nd Test (Basin Reserve, Wellington) – match drawn
 3rd Test (Eden Park, Auckland) – New Zealand won by 78 runs

England also played in 7 limited overs matches including 5 One Day Internationals.

India 2002–03
 1st Test at Basin Reserve, Wellington – New Zealand won by 10 wickets
 2nd Test at Westpac Park, Hamilton – New Zealand won by 4 wickets

Pakistan 2003–04
 1st Test at Westpac Park, Hamilton – match drawn
 2nd Test at Basin Reserve, Wellington – Pakistan won by 7 wickets

South Africa 2003–04
 [ 1st Test] at Westpac Park, Hamilton – match drawn
 [ 2nd Test] at Eden Park, Auckland – New Zealand won by 9 wickets
 [ 3rd Test] at Basin Reserve, Wellington – South Africa won by 6 wickets

Sri Lanka 2004–05
 [ 1st Test] at Westpac Park, Hamilton – game abandoned: tour cancelled following the Indian Ocean tsunami disaster
 [ 2nd Test] at Basin Reserve, Wellington – game abandoned: tour cancelled following the Indian Ocean tsunami disaster

Australia 2004–05
 [ 1st Test] at Jade Stadium, Christchurch – Australia won by 9 wickets
 [ 2nd Test] at Basin Reserve, Wellington – match drawn
 [ 3rd Test] at Eden Park, Auckland – Australia won by 9 wickets

Sri Lanka 2005–06
 [ 1st Test] at McLean Park, Napier – match drawn
 [ 2nd Test] at Basin Reserve, Wellington – New Zealand won by an innings and 38 runs

See: Sri Lankan cricket team in New Zealand in 2005–06

West Indies 2005–06
 [ 1st Test] at Eden Park, Auckland – New Zealand won by 27 runs
 [ 2nd Test] at Basin Reserve, Wellington – New Zealand won by 10 wickets
 [ 3rd Test] at McLean Park, Napier – match drawn

See: West Indies cricket team in New Zealand in 2005–06

Australia 2005–06
See : 2005–06 Chappell–Hadlee Trophy

Sri Lanka 2006–07
 [ 1st Test] at Jade Stadium, Christchurch – New Zealand won by 5 wickets
 [ 2nd Test] at Basin Reserve, Wellington – Sri Lanka won by 217 runs

See: Sri Lankan cricket team in New Zealand in 2006–07

Australia 2006–07 
[ 1st ODI ] at Westpac Stadium, Wellington – New Zealand won by 10 wickets
[ 2nd ODI ] at Eden Park, Auckland – New Zealand won by 5 wickets
[ 3rd ODI ] at Seddon Park, Hamilton – New Zealand won by 1 wicket

See: 2006–07 Chappell–Hadlee Trophy

Bangladesh 2007–08
ODI series
 [ 1st ODI] New Zealand v Bangladesh at  Eden Park, Auckland, 26 December 2007, New Zealand won by 6 wickets
 [ 2nd ODI] New Zealand v Bangladesh at McLean Park, Napier, 28 December 2007, New Zealand won by 102 runs (D/L method)
 [ 3rd ODI] New Zealand v Bangladesh at Queenstown Events Centre, Queenstown, 31 December 2007, New Zealand won by 10 wickets
New Zealand won series 3–0

Test series
 [ 1st Test] New Zealand v Bangladesh at University Oval, Dunedin, 4–6 January 2008, New Zealand won by 9 wickets
 [ 2nd Test] New Zealand v Bangladesh at Basin Reserve, Wellington, 12–14 January 2008, New Zealand won by an innings and 137 runs
New Zealand won series 2–0

England 2007–08
T20 series
[ 1st T20] New Zealand v England at Eden Park, Auckland, 5 February 2008, England won by 32 runs
[ 2nd T20] New Zealand v England at Jade Stadium, Christchurch – 7 February 2008, England won by 50 runs
England won series 2–0

ODI series
[ 1st ODI] New Zealand v England at Basin Reserve, Wellington, 9 February 2008, New Zealand won by 6 wickets
[ 2nd ODI] New Zealand v England at Seddon Park, Hamilton, 12 February 2008, New Zealand won by 10 wickets
[ 3rd ODI] New Zealand v England at Eden Park, Auckland, 15 February 2008, England won by 6 wickets
[ 4th ODI] New Zealand v England at McLean Park, Napier, 20 February 2008, Match tied
[ 5th ODI] New Zealand v England at AMI Stadium, Christchurch, 23 February 2008, New Zealand won by 34 runs
New Zealand won series 3–1

Test series
[ 1st Test] New Zealand v England at Eden Park, Auckland, 5–9 March 2008, New Zealand won by 189 runs
[ 2nd Test] New Zealand v England at Basin Reserve, Wellington, 13–17 Mar 2008, England won by 126 runs
[ 2nd Test] New Zealand v England at McLean Park, Napier, 22–26 Mar 2008, England won by 121 runs
England won series 2–1

West Indies 2008–09
Test series
 [ 1st Test] New Zealand v West Indies at University Oval, Dunedin, 11–15 Dec 2008, Match drawn
 [ 2nd Test] New Zealand v West Indies at McLean Park, Napier, 19–23 Dec 2008, Match drawn
Series drawn

T20 series
 [ 1st T20] New Zealand v West Indies at Eden Park, Auckland, 26 December 2008, Match tied (West Indies won the one-over eliminator)
 [ 2nd T20] New Zealand v West Indies at Seddon Park, Hamilton, 28 December 2008, New Zealand won by 36 runs
New Zealand won series 1–0

ODI series
[ 1st ODI ] at Queenstown Events Centre, Queenstown, 31 Dec 2008, No result
[ 2nd ODI ] at AMI Stadium, Christchurch, 3 Jan 2009, West Indies won by 5 wickets (D/L method)
[ 3rd ODI ] at Westpac Stadium, Wellington, 7 Jan 2009, New Zealand won by 7 wickets
[ 4th ODI ] at Eden Park, Auckland, 10 Jan 2009, No result
[ 5th ODI ] at McLean Park, Napier, 13 Jan 2009, New Zealand won by 9 runs (D/L method)
New Zealand won series 2–1

England A 2008–09

India 2008–09
T20 series
[ 1st T20 ] at AMI Stadium, Christchurch, 25 February 2009, New Zealand won by 7 wickets
[ 2nd T20 ] at Westpac Stadium, Wellington, 27 February 2009, New Zealand won by 5 wickets
New Zealand win series 2–0

ODI series
[ 1st ODI ] at McLean Park, Napier, 3 Mar 2009, India won by 53 runs
[ 2nd ODI ] at Westpac Stadium, Wellington, 6 Mar 2009, No result
[ 3rd ODI ] at AMI Stadium, Christchurch, 8 Mar 2009, India won by 58 runs
[ 4th ODI ] at Seddon Park, Hamilton, 11 Mar 2009, India won by 84 runs
[ 5th ODI ] at Eden Park, Auckland, 14 Mar 2009, New Zealand won by 8 runs
India wins series 3–1

Test series
[ 1st Test ] at Seddon Park, Hamiton, 18–21 Mar 2009, India won by 10 wickets 
[ 2nd Test ] at McLean Park, Napier, 26–30 March 2009, Match drawn 
[ 3rd test ] at Basin Reserve, Wellington, 3–7 Apr 2009, Match drawn due to rain
India wins series 1–0

See also
History of cricket in New Zealand

References

External sources
 CricketArchive – New Zealand season itineraries

Annual reviews
 Playfair Cricket Annual – editions from 2001
 Wisden Cricketers' Almanack – editions from 2001

Further reading